Sarla is a 1936 Indian Hindi-language drama film directed by Premankur Atorthy. The film was produced by Imperial Film Company. The director of photography was Rustam Irani with music by H. C. Bali. It starred Rattan Bai, Kumar,  Hafisji, Pramila, Anant Marathe and Ahindra Choudhury.

Cast
Rattan Bai
Kumar
Hafisji
Pramila
Ahindra Choudhury
Anant Marathe
Baba Vyas
Asooji
Chemist
Jilloobai

Songs

"Apna Hi Tujhko Vichar"
"Man Mein Udne Ko Kyun Soche"
"Hato Jao Hame Na Satao"
"Prabhu Tum Aao Daras Dikhao"
"Piya Ke Milne Ki Aas"
"Prabhu Mori Naiya Padi Majhdhar"
"Na Kisiki Ankh Ka Nur Hoon"
"Neha Barse Rhumjhum Rhumjhum"
"Gham-E-Dil Kis Se Kahoon"

References

External links

1936 films
1930s Hindi-language films
Films directed by Premankur Atorthy
Indian black-and-white films
Indian drama films
1936 drama films
Hindi-language drama films